Charles William Mitchell (1854–1903) was an English Pre-Raphaelite painter from Newcastle. A contemporary of John William Waterhouse, his work is similar in many ways. His one famous piece was Hypatia, shown in 1885 and likely inspired by the Charles Kingsley serialized novel Hypatia, or New Foes with an Old Face.  This painting is currently in the Laing Art Gallery.

References

External links

1854 births
1903 deaths
19th-century English painters
English male painters
20th-century English painters
Pre-Raphaelite painters
19th-century English male artists
20th-century English male artists